The 1999 SEAT Open Luxembourg doubles was the doubles event of the ninth edition of the most prestigious women's tennis tournament held in Luxembourg. Elena Likhovtseva and Ai Sugiyama was the defending champion but she did not compete in this year.

Irina Spîrlea and Caroline Vis won the title, defeating Slovenians Katarina Srebotnik and Tina Križan in the final.

Seeds

Draw

{{16TeamBracket-Compact-Tennis3
| RD1=First round
| RD2=Quarterfinals
| RD3=Semifinals
| RD4=Final
| RD1-seed01=1
| RD1-team01= I Spîrlea C Vis
| RD1-score01-1=6
| RD1-score01-2=6
| RD1-score01-3= 
| RD1-seed02= 
| RD1-team02= R Grande M Maštalířová
| RD1-score02-1=3
| RD1-score02-2=4
| RD1-score02-3= 
| RD1-seed03= 
| RD1-team03=
| RD1-score03-1=66
| RD1-score03-2=5
| RD1-score03-3= 
| RD1-seed04= 
| RD1-team04= J Kostanić T Pisnik
| RD1-score04-1=78
| RD1-score04-2=7
| RD1-score04-3= 
| RD1-seed05=3
| RD1-team05= E Callens D Van Roost
| RD1-score05-1=2
| RD1-score05-2=3
| RD1-score05-3= 
| RD1-seed06= 
| RD1-team06= K Hrdličková B Rittner
| RD1-score06-1=6
| RD1-score06-2=6
| RD1-score06-3= 
| RD1-seed07= 
| RD1-team07= S Plischke M Weingärtner
| RD1-score07-1=4
| RD1-score07-2=5
| RD1-score07-3= 
| RD1-seed08= 
| RD1-team08= M Oremans A-G Sidot
| RD1-score08-1=6
| RD1-score08-2=7
| RD1-score08-3= 
| RD1-seed09= 
| RD1-team09= K Clijsters J Henin
| RD1-score09-1= 
| RD1-score09-2= 
| RD1-score09-3= 
| RD1-seed10= 
| RD1-team10= J Kandarr S Pitkowski
| RD1-score10-1=w/o
| RD1-score10-2= 
| RD1-score10-3= 
| RD1-seed11= 
| RD1-team11= A Bachmann K Freye
| RD1-score11-1=1
| RD1-score11-2=0
| RD1-score11-3= 
| RD1-seed12=4
| RD1-team12= L Courtois A Huber
| RD1-score12-1=6
| RD1-score12-2=6
| RD1-score12-3= 
| RD1-seed13= 
| RD1-team13= K Cross L Woodroffe
| RD1-score13-1=6
| RD1-score13-2=6
| RD1-score13-3= 
| RD1-seed14=WC
| RD1-team14= C Schaul F Thill
| RD1-score14-1=0
| RD1-score14-2=1
| RD1-score14-3= 
| RD1-seed15= 
| RD1-team15= S Appelmans A Kremer
| RD1-score15-1=65
| RD1-score15-2=6
| RD1-score15-3=4
| RD1-seed16=2
| RD1-team16= T Križan K Srebotnik
| RD1-score16-1=77
| RD1-score16-2=3
| RD1-score16-3=6
| RD2-seed01=1
| RD2-team01= I Spîrlea C Vis
| RD2-score01-1=6
| RD2-score01-2=77
| RD2-score01-3= 
| RD2-seed02= 
| RD2-team02= J Kostanić T Pisnik
| RD2-score02-1=3
| RD2-score02-2=65
| RD2-score02-3= 
| RD2-seed03= 
| RD2-team03=
| RD2-score03-1=6
| RD2-score03-2=4
| RD2-score03-3=0
| RD2-seed04= 
| RD2-team04= M Oremans A-G Sidot
| RD2-score04-1=4
| RD2-score04-2=6
| RD2-score04-3=6
| RD2-seed05= 
| RD2-team05= J Kandarr S Pitkowski
| RD2-score05-1=1
| RD2-score05-2=0
| RD2-score05-3= 
| RD2-seed06=4
| RD2-team06= L Courtois A Huber
| RD2-score06-1=6
| RD2-score06-2=6
| RD2-score06-3= 
| RD2-seed07= 
| RD2-team07= K Cross L Woodroffe
| RD2-score07-1= 
| RD2-score07-2= 
| RD2-score07-3= 
| RD2-seed08=2
| RD2-team08= T Križan K Srebotnik
| RD2-score08-1=w/o
| RD2-score08-2= 
| RD2-score08-3= 
| RD3-seed01=1
| RD3-team01= I Spîrlea C Vis
| RD3-score01-1=7
| RD3-score01-2=6
| RD3-score01-3= 
| RD3-seed02= 
| RD3-team02= M Oremans A-G Sidot
| RD3-score02-1=5
| RD3-score02-2=3
| RD3-score02-3= 
| RD3-seed03=4
| RD3-team03= L Courtois A Huber
| RD3-score03-1=1
| RD3-score03-2=6
| RD3-score03-3=3
| RD3-seed04=2
| RD3-team04=

References
 ITF doubles results page

SEAT Open Luxembourg - Doubles
Luxembourg Open
1999 in Luxembourgian tennis